Aiko Kawasaki (1911–1936), also known as , was a Japanese avant-garde poet.

Biography
Chika Sagawa, née Aiko Kawasaki, was born in Yoichi, Hokkaido, Japan, in 1911. She started studies to become an English teacher, but moved to Tokyo at the age of seventeen to join her brother, Kawasaki Noboru, who was already established in literary circles. They became part of Arukuiyu no kurabu (Arcueil Club), a modernist literary group centred on Katué Kitasono, who championed her work.

Kawasaki took on the pen-name Sagawa, from the characters for left and river, a likely allusion to the Left Bank of the Seine.

Her first publication was a translation of the Hungarian writer Ferenc Molnár, while her first poem, Konchu (Insects) was published the following year. In her translations, she focused on mainstream poets, but her own poems were influenced by surrealism. Another source cites Aoi Uma (The Blue Horse) as Sagawa's first poem, appearing in August 1930.

Sagawa's poems appeared in the Arcueil Club's magazine Madame Blanche, and she participated in the journal Shi to Shiron (Poetry and Poetics), a publication venture for Japanese avant-garde poets collectively called l'esprit nouveau. Her translations of James Joyce, Virginia Woolf and other contemporary European writers appeared in these magazines, as well as Bungei Rebyû (The Literary Review).

Sagawa developed stomach cancer in 1935 and died in January 1936, aged 24.

Selected works
 James Joyce, Chamber Music, 1932, Shiinokisha – translated by Sagawa Chika
  – English translation by Sawako Nakayasu
  – English translation by Sawako Nakayasu
  – English translation by Sawako Nakayasu

References

External links
 

1911 births
1936 deaths
People from Yoichi, Hokkaido
Japanese women poets
20th-century Japanese women writers
20th-century Japanese poets